Any Dream Will Do, is a 2007 talent show-themed television series produced by the BBC in the United Kingdom. It searched for a new, unknown lead to play Joseph in a West End revival of the Andrew Lloyd Webber musical Joseph and the Amazing Technicolor Dreamcoat.

The show was hosted by Graham Norton, who announced Lee Mead as the winner of the final public telephone vote on 9 June 2007.

It was the second West-End talent show to be produced by the BBC/Andrew Lloyd Webber, after How Do You Solve a Problem like Maria?.  Further talent shows in the series have aired, with I'd Do Anything running in 2008 and Over the Rainbow which ran in April/May 2010.

LIoyd Webber, Zoe Tyler & John Barrowman returned as panelists and Graham Norton returned to host the show.

A similar format has been used as well in The Netherlands in 2008, with the show Op zoek naar Joseph (Looking for Joseph) taking an unknown singer and placing the winner in the lead role for the 2009 performances in The Netherlands. On 26 October 2008, Freek Bartels was announced the winner of the show.

Format
Commissioned after the success of the similar BBC series How Do You Solve A Problem Like Maria?, the series followed the same format to find a new, unknown lead for a revival of Joseph and the Amazing Technicolor Dreamcoat. The series was named after the song from the musical, "Any Dream Will Do".

Expert panel

David Ian did not appear on this show and was replaced by Bill Kenwright.

An expert panel provided advice to the contestants throughout the series, and provided comments during the live shows. As they appeared on screen from right to left, the panel was made up of:
 Zoe Tyler, vocal coach to the contestants (vocal coach, singer and performer)
 Bill Kenwright (theatre producer and co-producer of Joseph and the Amazing Technicolor Dreamcoat at the Adelphi Theatre)
 Denise Van Outen (musical theatre actress and television presenter) who later went on to date and marry winner Lee Mead.
 John Barrowman (musical theatre and television actor)
 Andrew Lloyd Webber, head judge and composer of Joseph. (Presenter Graham Norton referred to him differently each week, mostly using variations of "Lord" phrases. When he was announced as part of the expert panel, the chandeliers behind him flashed and a few bars from The Phantom of the Opera rang out. Usually, Lloyd Webber showed mock embarrassment or surprise, while John and Denise feigned either fright or worship of him.)

Auditions
The first week of the show documented the initial auditions where one hundred hopefuls, from thousands, were called back to London. This was further whittled-down by the panel of judges to fifty contestants who would enter Andrew Lloyd Webber's "Joseph School". However, two additional entrants were selected over this fifty contestant limit after they went to Lloyd Webber's personal studio for a second audition.

In the second week, the fifty individuals selected attended "Joseph School" where the coaches worked on singing, acting and choreography with the contestants. Former Joseph actor Jason Donovan, amongst others, visited to lend his advice and support for them. On the second day, one contestant left the competition, twenty-three were eliminated and only twenty eight remained. On the third day, another eight men were eliminated, leaving only twenty contestants in the competition. These men were taken to Lloyd Webber's castle in Ireland, where they performed live in front of a packed house of locals and industry professionals including Louis Walsh. The best twelve were then taken through to the live studio finals.

Finalists

Twelve potential Josephs were chosen, each wearing a unique coloured coat. At the end of every live show, the Joseph who was eliminated had his coat stripped off whilst singing a song of farewell (a combination of "Poor, Poor Joseph" and "Close Every Door to Me").

Results summary
Colour key

Live shows
The twelve finalists, (or "Josephs"), were announced on 7 April 2007, with the live studio finals starting a week later. Each week the "Josephs" were set various singing and performing tasks each week. They were introduced with clips summarising their past week before performing a solo song and hearing comments from the panel. Each week they also performed two group songs, one from Joseph at the start of each show and one after the solo performances. All the performances were live in front of a studio audience, with a live band headed by Nigel Wright and backing singers.

Every week, a Joseph was eliminated from the competition. The public got a chance to vote for their favourite Joseph by calling in after all the finalists' solo performances. The two Josephs with the fewest votes in a given week performed a sing-off in front of Lloyd-Webber, who then decided which contestant to keep, based upon how well he felt that contender would fill the Joseph role. The eliminated Joseph then performed "Poor, Poor Joseph/Close Every Door" together with the remaining Josephs as his grand exit song, symbolically handing back his dreamcoat.

Week 1 (14 April 2007)
 Theme-No1s
Group performances:
"Any Dream Will Do"
"Luck Be a Lady" (from Guys and Dolls)

Panel's verdict on who was not Joseph
John Barrowman: Craig Chalmers
Denise Van Outen: Craig Chalmers
Bill Kenwright: Chris Crosby
Zoe Tyler: Antony Hansen

Sing-off:

Week 2 (21 April 2007)
 Theme: Pop Classics
Group performances:
"Jacob & Sons/Joseph's Coat"
"Pinball Wizard" (The Who)
Mission:
Coming on stage at a McFly concert

Panel's verdict on who was not Joseph
John Barrowman: Johndeep More 
Denise Van Outen: Ben Ellis 
Bill Kenwright: Johndeep More
Zoe Tyler: Ben Ellis

Sing-off:

Week 3 (28 April 2007)

In a double elimination, two Josephs were voted off the series.
 Theme-Mixed Music
Group performances:
"Go, Go, Go Joseph"
"One Vision" (Queen)
Mission:
Singing "Pharaoh's Dream Explained" from Joseph and the Amazing Technicolor Dreamcoat to their mothers in a loin cloth.

Panel's verdict on who was Joseph
John Barrowman: Daniel Boys
Denise Van Outen: Daniel Boys
Bill Kenwright: Lee Mead
Zoe Tyler: Keith Jack

Sing-off 1:

Panel's verdict on who was not Joseph
John Barrowman: Rob McVeigh
Denise Van Outen: Chris Barton
Bill Kenwright: Rob McVeigh
Zoe Tyler: Chris Barton

Sing-off 2:

Notes:
 Upon being asked whether he was surprised that he was being sent home, Seamus said: "The words 'conspiracy theory' are going through my head" (Although he later implied he may have been joking).

Week 4 (5 May 2007)
 Theme-Decades
Group performances:
"Song of the King"
"Dead Ringer For Love" (Meat Loaf)
Mission:
Climbing the barricade and singing "Do You Hear The People Sing" from the musical Les Misérables

Panel's verdict on who was not Joseph
John Barrowman: Lewis Bradley
Denise Van Outen: Rob McVeigh
Bill Kenwright: Rob McVeigh
Zoe Tyler: Lee Mead

Sing-off:

Notes:
 Prior to the farewell song, Graham Norton asked Chris who he thought was going to win the competition; Chris chose Lewis.

Week 5 (12 May 2007)

Group performances:
"One More Angel in Heaven"
"You Really Got Me" (The Kinks)
Mission:
Practising being aggressive with John Barrowman

Panel's verdict on who was not Joseph
John Barrowman: Rob McVeigh
Denise Van Outen: Rob McVeigh
Bill Kenwright: Rob McVeigh
Zoe Tyler: Daniel Boys

Sing-off:

Week 6 (19 May 2007)
Theme: Colors
With only six finalists remaining, the Josephs were announced in sets of three and performed in a trio as well as their individual performances.

Group performances:
"Go, Go, Go Joseph"
Keith, Lewis and Ben: "That's Life" (Frank Sinatra)
Craig, Daniel and Lee: "Don't Rain on My Parade" (Barbra Streisand)
"She Loves You" (The Beatles)
Mission:
Dating and trying to seduce Denise van Outen

Panel's verdict on who was not Joseph
John Barrowman: Lewis Bradley
Denise Van Outen: Craig Chalmers
Bill Kenwright: Keith Jack
Zoe Tyler: Lewis Bradley

Sing-off:

Notes:
Both Graham Norton and the panel expressed shock that Daniel was sent home much earlier than had been expected of him.

Week 7 (26 May 2007)

Theme: The Five Themes of Joseph (Dreaming, Vulnerability, Betrayal, Courage and Arrogance)

One of the finalists was chosen by Josh Groban to perform "You Raise Me Up" with him live in front of the audience. Lee Mead was the lucky one while the remaining four were back-up singers.

Group performances:
"A Pharaoh Story"
"Do You Love Me" (The Contours)
"Born to Be Wild" (Steppenwolf)
Lee Mead & The Josephs with Josh Groban: "You Raise Me Up"
Mission:
Falling from heights to show courage

Panel's verdict on who was not Joseph
John Barrowman: Lewis Bradley
Denise Van Outen: Lewis Bradley
Bill Kenwright: Ben Ellis
Zoe Tyler: Ben Ellis

Sing-off:

Week 8 (2 June 2007)

The semi-final was held on 2 June 2007, in which the remaining four Josephs competed for the three remaining spots in the final. Again announced in sets of two, the contestants performed duets of Andrew Lloyd Webber songs with another Joseph in addition to their solo performance. At the end of the show, the three finalists were announced.

Group performances:
"Jacob & Sons/Joseph's Coat"
Keith and Ben: "I am the Starlight" (from Starlight Express)
Lewis and Lee: "Oh What a Circus" (from Evita)
"Under Pressure" (Queen & David Bowie)
Mission:
Being given a tour backstage at The Lord of the Rings musical

Panel's verdict on who was not Joseph
John Barrowman: Lewis Bradley
Denise Van Outen: Lewis Bradley
Bill Kenwright: Ben Ellis
Zoe Tyler: Ben Ellis

Sing-off:

Notes:
 Ben later said he was disappointed in the panel's comments regarding his performance that week, but nevertheless accepted his elimination graciously.

Week 9 (9 June 2007)

The final, held on 9 June 2007, featured three songs from each of the Josephs: in addition to their regular performance, each performed a big band number and the final two repeated their favourite song from the series. The opening song was performed by all 12 Josephs, supported by the winner of a national Joseph Choir search – the choir of East Ham's Brampton Primary School in east London.

Group performances:
All Josephs with the Brampton Primary School Choir: "Go, Go, Go Joseph"
Lee, Keith and Lewis: "Maria" (from West Side Story)
The Former Josephs: "The Boys Are Back in Town" (Thin Lizzy)
Keith and Lee: "Superstar" (from Jesus Christ Superstar)

The success of the programme prompted the BBC to extend the series by an extra week (week nine), removing the need for a double eviction prior to the final. The new date for the final, 9 June 2007, ensured it would air directly opposite the final of ITV's competing show, Grease is the Word. This move paid off as the final of Any Dream Will Do managed to secure the upper hand over Grease is the Word in viewing figures with a peak of 8.5 million viewers and an audience share of 39.6%, compared with ITV's high of 4.9 million viewers (an audience share of 23.5%).

In the final, over three million votes were cast with Lee Mead being announced as the winner. He sang "Any Dream Will Do" to close the series and his prize was six months (later extended to eighteen) in the lead role of a revival of Joseph and the Amazing Technicolor Dreamcoat in London's West End.

After the series

Winner
Before the opening night of Joseph at London's Adelphi Theatre, publicity from the TV show had brought in £10 million in advance ticket sales, leading to a five-month extension to the show's run and an extension of Mead's contract until June 2008.

Mead's version of "Any Dream Will Do", along with "Close Every Door" performed by the three finalists, was released as a single to raise money for BBC Children in Need. It reached number two in the UK Singles Chart.

His first public performance after the win was on 1 July 2007 at the Concert for Diana at London's Wembley Stadium, where he sang "Any Dream Will Do" with former Joseph actors Donny Osmond and Jason Donovan.

Mead, along with the winner, Connie Fisher and last five runners-up of the previous Lloyd-Webber reality show How Do You Solve a Problem Like Maria? starred in a one-off Christmas Eve special on BBC One entitled When Joseph Met Maria.

Other finalists
Fifth-placed Craig Chalmers was cast by Bill Kenwright as Joseph in the touring version of Joseph from 20 August 2007. The tour was due to have its first night in Bromley, London, less than 24 km (about 15 miles) from the Adelphi, where Kenwright was co-producer. In Chalmers' last week before viewers voted him off the programme, Kenwright had told him: "You wowed the audience and please God you are here next week for the semi-final." Chris Barton played Benjamin on the tour and at some matinees Joseph or the Narrator. He then went on to be a Swing in Spring Awakening in both Hammersmith and the Novello west end. Kenwright employed Chris Crosby on his new national tour of Half a Sixpence opening on 28 August 2007 at the Churchill Theatre in Bromley.

Keith Jack joined the cast of the touring Joseph production with Craig and Chris Barton. He played the Narrator, a part usually played by a woman though originally written for a male voice.  His first official performance was on 1 October in Plymouth although he performed a couple of the final shows in High Wycombe on 28 and 29 September. He has now finished playing this role. He was recording an album to be released in early 2008 with a single from it issued in time for Christmas. In June 2010, Keith took the Dreamcoat from Craig and continued his role till May 2013.

In January 2008 Antony Hansen joined the cast of Bill Kenwright's touring production of Joseph as a brother. During this time Bill Kenwright formed a boy band named Dream On from the contestants on Any Dream Will Do. Hansen and fellow finalists Chalmers, Bradley, Crosby and Barton's debut album became a chart success in its first two weeks. In May 2008, Bill Kenwright cast Hansen as Pharaoh in the national tour of Joseph. In January/February 2009 Hansen played the lead role of Joseph for Bill Kenwright. Hansen joined the west end cast of Les Misérables in June 2009 in the ensemble and first cover Marius. July 2009 saw Hansen and fellow Any Dream Will Do contestant Craig Chalmers finish recording their 2nd album together with BK Productions – Saturday Night at the Movies.

Lewis Bradley was contracted by Lloyd Webber to play Joseph at the Adelphi Theatre during Mead's holiday absence, and possibly for an additional performance a week.  Meanwhile, Ben James-Ellis (Ben Ellis, who adopted the name James-Ellis for Equity purposes) landed the role of Link Larkin in the UK premiere of Hairspray: The Musical at the Shaftesbury Theatre from 11 October 2007. Daniel Boys went on to land many roles including performing in the Royal Festival Hall's concert production of Sweeney Todd, Landor Theatre's I Love You Because and the lead role of Princeton in Avenue Q at the Noël Coward Theatre. He also took part in the cabaret If You've Got It Flaunt It at the West End's Trafalgar Studios in September 2007.

Rob McVeigh entered the United Kingdom selection process for the Eurovision Song Contest 2008 in a unique Joseph vs. Maria showdown.  He lost the heat to his Maria counterpart Simona Armstrong.

Johndeep More went on to appear in Nevermind The Broadway and a pantomime Cinderella (with Crosby).

Craig Chalmers was to appear as Prince Charming in a pantomime, but was sacked when it came to light that he had previously appeared in porn films.

Criticism
In an interview with The Stage, the then-recently eliminated Daniel Boys questioned Andrew Lloyd Webber's stated aim of casting a Joseph outside the stereotype, "who's a bit of a Justin Timberlake, tiny touch of the Michael Jacksons and a bit of the Jude Laws," by pointing out that so far all the Josephs that were a bit outside of the traditional mould have been eliminated for exactly that reason.

Ratings 
Ratings taken from BARB.

References

External links 

The Stage on Any Dream Will Do
Unreality TV on Any Dream Will Do
Any Dream Will Do at What's on TV

BBC Television shows
BBC high definition shows
2000s British reality television series
Singing talent shows
2007 British television series debuts
2007 British television series endings